Ku Tsui-ping is a Taiwanese karateka. She won the gold medal in the women's kumite 50 kg event at the 2014 Asian Games held in Incheon, South Korea.

Career 

She won one of the bronze medals in the women's 50 kg event at the 2016 World University Karate Championships held in Braga, Portugal. She also won the silver medal in the women's team kumite event.

At the 2017 Asian Karate Championships held in Astana, Kazakhstan, she won the silver medal in the women's team kumite event, alongside Chao Jou, Gu Shiau-shuang and Wen Tzu-yun.

In June 2021, she competed at the World Olympic Qualification Tournament held in Paris, France hoping to qualify for the 2020 Summer Olympics in Tokyo, Japan. In November 2021, she competed in the women's 61 kg event at the World Karate Championships held in Dubai, United Arab Emirates. In December 2021, she won the silver medal in her event at the Asian Karate Championships held in Almaty, Kazakhstan.

Achievements

References

External links 
 

Living people
Year of birth missing (living people)
Place of birth missing (living people)
Taiwanese female karateka
Karateka at the 2014 Asian Games
Medalists at the 2014 Asian Games
Asian Games medalists in karate
Asian Games gold medalists for Chinese Taipei
21st-century Taiwanese women